Manfred Roost (born 1929) is a German conductor and choir director.

Life 
Roost studied education and worked as a teacher in Jüterbog after his studies. He completed additional studies at the Institute for Music Education at the Humboldt University of Berlin; he studied conducting with Helmut Koch. In 1955, he founded the Rundfunk-Kinderchor [Radio Children's Choir] there on behalf of the German radio station, which he conducted from 1955 to 2002. In 1978, Roost was appointed professor. With his choir he undertook many concert tours and made extensive radio and audio recordings.

References

External links 
 
 

German conductors (music)
1929 births
Living people
Place of birth missing (living people)